South Waverly is a borough in Bradford County, Pennsylvania, United States. It is part of Northeastern Pennsylvania. The population was 1,070 at the 2020 census. South Waverly is part of the Penn-York Valley (called "The Valley"), a group of four contiguous communities in New York and Pennsylvania: Waverly, New York, South Waverly, Sayre, and Athens, with a combined population near 30,000.

Geography
South Waverly is located in Bradford County along the New York state line at  (41.995606, -76.540014). It is bordered to the west by the Chemung River, a few miles north of its confluence with the Susquehanna River. To the north in Tioga County, New York, is the village of Waverly. To the east and south is the borough of Sayre.

Interstate 86, maintained by New York State despite being in Pennsylvania, runs through the northern edge of South Waverly, leading west  to Elmira, New York, and east (as New York State Route 17)  to Binghamton.

Demographics

As of the census of 2000, there were 987 people, 410 households, and 282 families residing in the borough. The population density was 1,124.6 people per square mile (433.0/km²). There were 431 housing units at an average density of 491.1 per square mile (189.1/km²). The racial makeup of the borough was 97.16% White, 0.51% African American, 0.91% Native American, 0.91% Asian, and 0.51% from two or more races. Hispanic or Latino of any race were 0.10% of the population.

There were 410 households, out of which 26.3% had children under the age of 18 living with them, 58.3% were married couples living together, 8.5% had a female householder with no husband present, and 31.0% were non-families. 26.1% of all households were made up of individuals, and 11.2% had someone living alone who was 65 years of age or older. The average household size was 2.41 and the average family size was 2.90.

In the borough the population was spread out, with 22.9% under the age of 18, 4.6% from 18 to 24, 24.2% from 25 to 44, 30.9% from 45 to 64, and 17.4% who were 65 years of age or older. The median age was 44 years. For every 100 females there were 92.8 males. For every 100 females age 18 and over, there were 90.3 males.

The median income for a household in the borough was $41,375, and the median income for a family was $48,125. Males had a median income of $32,875 versus $22,969 for females. The per capita income for the borough was $22,608. About 6.5% of families and 9.6% of the population were below the poverty line, including 18.9% of those under age 18 and 4.7% of those age 65 or over.

References

Populated places established in 1783
Boroughs in Bradford County, Pennsylvania
1878 establishments in Pennsylvania